Kerstin Mohring (born 26 September 1963) is a former East German cross-country skier who competed from 1988 to 1989. At the 1988 Winter Olympics in Calgary, she finished fifth in the 4 x 5 km relay and seventh in the 20 km event.

Mohring's best World Cup finish was fifth in a 30 km event in Norway in 1988. She married luger Jochen Pietzsch. Her father, Werner Moring (1927–1995), represented Germany in cross-country skiing at the 1956 Winter Olympics.

References

External links

Women's 4 x 5 km cross-country relay Olympic results: 1976–2002 

1963 births
Living people
Cross-country skiers at the 1988 Winter Olympics
German female cross-country skiers
Olympic cross-country skiers of East Germany